Michael John Townsend (born 17 May 1986) is an English footballer who plays for Sutton Coldfield Town

Playing career

Wolverhampton Wanderers
Townsend started his career at Wolverhampton Wanderers as a youth team player where he signed a three-year scholarship. He impressed in the youth teams and was quickly promoted to the reserve side where he established himself as a regular for two seasons. Having not made the breakthrough into the first team Townsend was released by manager Dave Jones at the end of the 2003–04 season.

Cheltenham Town
Townsend then joined Cheltenham Town on a free transfer in January 2005. He became a regular in the Cheltenham team the following season, he appeared 35 times in his first season in defence.

It was a successful season which saw Cheltenham promoted into League One, Townsend went on to make 70 appearances for Cheltenham at this level scoring twice.

Following a lengthy period of injury Townsend returned to regain his place in the Cheltenham side alongside Shane Duff, and helping Cheltenham to avoid relegation. As of August 2009, Townsend has made 140 appearances for Cheltenham Town.

Barnet (loan)
He joined Barnet on a months loan in October 2008, the loan was then extended after a few good performances.

Townsend turned down the chance of rejoining Barnet on loan in early 2009 and vowed to fight for a place in the Cheltenham Town team. Shortly afterwards Cheltenham Town manager Martin Allen commented that some players at the club would rather sit on the bench and waste their careers than go out to another club and play football. However, through a mixture of attitude, hard work and determination, he had re-established himself as a key member of the Cheltenham Town defence by September 2009 following several man of the match performances at the end of the 2008–09 and the start of the 2009–10 seasons, including three goals.

He was released by the club along with seven other players in May 2010.

Hereford United
On 15 July 2010, he signed a two-year deal with Hereford United. On 25 January 2012, Townsend then signed an extension to his contract to keep him at Edgar Street after several strong performances, he scooped the 'Players Player' of the year award and made more appearances than any other player for the second consecutıve year.

Townsend was released by Hereford United at the end of the 2012–13 season after making only seven league appearances due to injury.

Tamworth
After rehab from injury Townsend joined Conference National side Tamworth on 9 January 2014 as Dale Belford looked to bolster his defensive options. His first game was against Rugby Town in the Birmingham Senior Cup, a match that Tamworth won 1–0.

Townsend went on to make six league appearances for Tamworth during the 2013–14 season, before fracturing a vertebra in the 2–1 defeat at home to Forest Green Rovers on 15 March 2014. This injury ruled him out for the remainder of the season, a season in which Tamworth were relegated to the Conference North.

Townsend was the first player to commit to Tamworth for the 2014–15 Conference North season. Shortly before the start of the Conference North season, manager Dale Belford unveiled Townsend as the club captain.

Rushall Olympic
Townsend moved to Dales Lane after deciding to leave Tamworth to link up with former coach Richard Sneekes.

Sneekes admitted to admiring Townsend after working closely with him at Hereford United in League 2 and quickly installed him in the middle of his defence and has also used him in a central midfield.

A local lad, Townsend reviled in the press that Rushall was his very first club as a boy and is enjoying his football back at 'home'.

Rushall Olympic
On 19 January 2018, Rushall Olympic manager Liam McDonald announced the return to Michael Townsend to the club.

Chasetown
It was announced on 8 August 2019, that Chasetown has signed Michael.

Hinckley
Townsend signed for Hinckley, and was named in the matchday squad for a Midland League Division One fixture away at Nuneaton Griff on 2 November 2019, a game in which his new side won 2-1.

Michael's stay with the club was a short lived one, as his departure was announced by the club on 6 November 2019, with just the one appearance to his name.

Coalville Town
On 9 November 2019, Southern League Premier Central side Coalville Town announced the signing Townsend. On the same day the club announced the departure of Charlie Jemson to divisional rivals Peterborough Sports.

Stratford Town
After a short spell with Walsall Wood, Townsend returned to the Southern League Premier Central on 1 February 2020, when he joined Stratford Town.

Redditch United
In June 2020, Townsend moved to Redditch United.

Career statistics

References

External links

1986 births
Living people
Sportspeople from Walsall
English footballers
Association football defenders
Wolverhampton Wanderers F.C. players
Cheltenham Town F.C. players
Barnet F.C. players
Hereford United F.C. players
Tamworth F.C. players
Rushall Olympic F.C. players
Sutton Coldfield Town F.C. players
Stafford Rangers F.C. players
Barwell F.C. players
Wolverhampton Sporting C.F.C. players
Halesowen Town F.C. players
Quorn F.C. players
Nuneaton Borough F.C. players
Chasetown F.C. players
Hinckley A.F.C. players
Coalville Town F.C. players
Walsall Wood F.C. players
Stratford Town F.C. players
Redditch United F.C. players
English Football League players
National League (English football) players